Woldia City is an Ethiopian football club based in the city of Woldia. They currently play in the Ethiopian Premier League, the top domestic level of football in Ethiopia.

References

External links
Soccerway – 2014–15 Ethiopian season

Football clubs in Ethiopia